Eduardo Márquez Obando (27 March 1944 – 3 August 2020) was a Peruvian footballer who played forward.

Biography
Nicknamed Patato, Obando was a star for FBC Melgar in his hometown on Arequipa after his youth career with Estrella Mistiana de Manzanitos. He played for the organization from 1962 to 1974, with the club spending five years in the Peruvian Primera División. He scored 197 goals in 240 games with FBC Melgar, making him the club's top goal scorer all-time. They won the Copa Perú in 1971.

Eduardo Márquez Obando died on 3 August 2020 in Arequipa at the age of 76.

References

External links

1944 births
2020 deaths
Peruvian footballers
FBC Melgar footballers
People from Arequipa
Association football forwards